Napoleon (1769–1821) also known as Napoleon Bonaparte or Napoleon I, was a French military leader and emperor.

Napoleon, Napoléon, Napoleón, Napoleone, or Napoleonic may also refer to:
Napoleon (given name), a given name, including list of people and characters with the name
Napoleone, an Italian masculine given name

Fictional characters
 Napoleon (Animal Farm), the main antagonist of George Orwell's Animal Farm
 Napoleon, a bloodhound in The Aristocats
 Napoleon, a character in My Uncle Napoleon
 Napoleon, a nickname given to Captain Mainwaring by Chief ARP Warden Hodges in Dad's Army

Film, stage, and television
 Napoléon (1927 film), a French silent film by Abel Gance
 Napoleon (1951 film), an Italian film by Carlo Borghesio 
 Napoléon (1955 film), a French historical epic by Sacha Guitry
 Napoleon (1995 film), an Australian film by Mario Andreacchio
 Napoleon (2007 film), a British made-for-TV film
 Napoleon (2023 film), an American film by Ridley Scott
 Napoléon (miniseries), a 2002 historical miniseries
 Napoleon (musical)
Napoleon, an unrealized project of Stanley Kubrick

Games

Board games 
 Napoleon (board game), a 1974 board game about the Waterloo campaign
 Napoleon Gambit, a variation of the Scotch Game chess opening
 Napoleon Opening, a chess opening

Card games 
 Napoleon (card game), a trick-taking card game
 Napoleon at St Helena, a two-deck patience or solitaire
 Napoleon, a single-deck patience or solitaire more commonly known as Freecell
 Napoleon's Square, a patience or solitaire

Video or PC games 
 Napoleon (video game), a 2001 Game Boy Advance game
 Napoleon: Total War, a strategy game for the PC
 Napoleon, a real-time strategy game for Windows
 Napoleon, a video game published by Enix

Music
 Napoleon (band), a British metalcore band
 "Napoleon", a song by Ani DiFranco from Dilate
 Napoleon XIV, stage name of singer Jerry Samuels
 José María Napoleón, Mexican singer and composer

People
 Napoleon II (1811–1832), son of Napoleon I
 Napoleon III (1808–1873), last monarch and first president of France, son of Napoleon I's brother Louis
 Napoléon, Prince Imperial (1856–1879), the only child of Emperor Napoleon III
 Prince Napoléon Bonaparte (1822-1891), son of Napoleon I's brother Jérôme
 Napoléon, comte Daru (1807–1890), French soldier and politician, godson of Napoléon 
 Napoleon A. L'Herault (1882-1932), American lawyer and politician
 Napoleon (actor) (born 1963), Tamil film actor
 Napoleon (rapper) (born 1977), American rapper
 Napoleon Bonaparte (police officer) (born 1965), Indonesian police officer

Places

Australia
 Napoleons, Victoria

Poland
 Napoleon, Silesian Voivodeship

United States
 Napoleon, Arkansas
 Napoleon, Indiana
 Napoleon, Kentucky
 Napoleon, Michigan
 Napoleon, Mississippi
 Napoleon, Missouri
 Napoleon, North Dakota
 Napoleon, Ohio
 Napoleon Township (disambiguation)

Ships
 Napoléon-class ship of the line, a class of ship of the French Navy
 French ship Napoléon, a French Navy ship name
 French battleship Napoléon, a French ship of the line commissioned in 1850
 MV Napoleon, a British ship
 Corse (ship) or Napoléon, a French schooner ship

Other uses
 Napoléon (coin)
 Napoleon (gun), a cannon
 Napoleon, a grade of cognac
 Napoleon (pastry) or Mille-feuille, a French pastry
 Napoleon sweets, small Belgian sweet 
 Humphead wrasse or Napoleon fish
 Napoleone, a comics series  published by Sergio Bonelli Editore
 Napoleonic collar, a kind of turnover collar
 Napoleon (company), a manufacturer of fireplaces and grills
 Napoleonic (Fabergé egg)

See also

 Age of Napoleon (board game), a 2003 board game about the Napoleonic Wars in Europe
 Napoleon and Uncle Elby, a syndicated comic strip
 Napoleon complex, a psychological condition affecting short people
 Napoleonite, a variety of igneous rock
 Napoleon Bonaparte (disambiguation)
 Prince Napoléon (disambiguation)